Alfheim or Alvheim is an old Norse place-name. It may refer to:

Álfheimr, home of the elves in Norse mythology
Álfheimr (region), a historical region
Alfheim Mountain Cabin, a cabin in Sunndal, Norway
Alfheim stadion, a football stadium in Tromsø, Norway
Alfheimbjerg, Greenland
Alfheim is also the name of individual areas in several Norwegian municipalities. An area named Alfheim may be found in:
Asker
Grue
Halden
Lier
Tromsø

Alfheim or Alvheim is a Norwegian surname:
Frode Alfheim
John Alvheim